Opinogóra  may refer to:

 Opinogóra Górna
 Opinogóra Dolna
 Opinogóra-Kolonia
 Gmina Opinogóra Górna